The John Hafen House is a historic house located at 1002 South Main Street in Springville, Utah. It is locally significant primarily for its association with Hafen, an important Mormon artist.

Description and history 
The three-story brick and timber house was constructed in 1900, and was designed by architect Alberto Treganza for his friend John Hafen.

It was listed on the National Register of Historic Places on July 23, 1982.

See also

 National Register of Historic Places listings in Utah County, Utah

Notes

References

External links

Houses completed in 1900
Houses on the National Register of Historic Places in Utah
Houses in Utah County, Utah
National Register of Historic Places in Utah County, Utah
Buildings and structures in Springville, Utah